Phet Sein Kun Taung Shwe Wuttu-to Mya  is a 2003 collection of 15 short stories by Khin Khin Htoo. It won the Myanmar National Literature Award for Collected Short Stories for 2003. All these short stories have been printed in Shwe Amyutei Magazine.

The stories are about the lives of rural Burmese people and culture.

The Stories

Trivia
 Her story Kyo Tan is regarded as one of the Best Short Stories of Burmese Literature during ten years by Ottayala Min.

References

2003 short story collections
Burmese literature
Burmese short story collections